The Caudron Type F was a French single seat biplane produced just before World War I. A dozen were bought by China and at least two other examples, with different engines, competed in 1913, coming first and second in the biplane category of the cross-country race at Reims.  Flown by Pierre Chanteloup, one was the first biplane to loop-the-loop.

Design and development
The Type F was a single seat biplane with the same layout as all other Caudron landbased biplanes before it, apart from the Type B Multiplace. They were all twin boom tractor configuration aircraft with a short central nacelle and twin fins. Compared to the Type B to Type E range, the Type F differed most obviously in the nacelle design and the vertical tail shape. By 1913, when the Type F appeared, at least one of each of the earlier types had been modified from an equal span biplane to a sesquiplane; like the Type E, the Type F was a sesquiplane from the start.

Like these earlier Caudrons, the Type F was a wire braced two bay biplane with two spar fabric covered wings having the same rectangular plan apart from angled tips. Upper and lower spans were in the ratio 1.8. There was no stagger, so the two sets of parallel interplane struts were parallel and vertical. The outer sections of the upper wings were supported by parallel pairs of outward leaning struts from the bases of the outer interplane struts, at the tip of the lower wing. The rear spar was ahead of mid-chord, leaving the ribs in the rear part of the wing flexible and allowing roll control by wing warping.

The nacelle was a development of the earlier simple, flat sided structures, but no longer with its sides curving upwards in profile to the engine. Instead, the upper edges of this structure were straight, with a curved decking which ran forward, rounding into a cowling around the  Gnome Omega seven cylinder radial engine. The cowling was more complete than on the earlier models, though in the manner of the time there was a gap at the bottom to allowed lost oil to escape. At least one Type F had an uncowled Anzani 10-cylinder radial engine.  The cockpit's forward rim was raised up, making it more enclosed and better defined; similar protection had been introduced on the Type D2 and Type E.  As before, the nacelle was supported above the lower wing on two more pairs of interplane struts; these were enclosed by the nacelle, as on the Type D.

The empennage of the type F was supported on a pair of girders arranged parallel to one another in plan. The upper girder members were attached to the upper wing spars at the tops of the innermost interplane struts and the lower ones ran under the lower wing, mounted on inverted W-form struts from the bottom of the inner interplane pairs. These lower members, which supported the aircraft on the ground as skids, each carried twin, rubber sprung landing wheels. Behind the wing the upper and lower members converged to the rear, the drag on the lower members reducing the landing run.  There were three vertical cross braces on each girder but the only lateral inter-girder cross-members were near the tail, though there was wire bracing. The broad chord, roughly rectangular, warping tailplane was mounted just below the upper girder member. Above it and instead of the earlier rectangular rudders there was a pair of small triangular fins, each mounting a broad rudder with a gently rounded leading edges and a straight, vertical trailing edge. The fins were separated by about one third of the tailplane span.

In 1913 Caudron had already sold at least two of the earlier two seat Type Ds to China and by early 1913 they had obtained an order for twelve of the single seat Type Fs. Emile Obre, from Caudron, and Bon, from the French colonial forces, went to Beijing to organise an aviation centre. Two Type Fs competed at the Reims meeting at the end of September 1913, one Anzani powered and flown by Gaston Caudron and the other, Gnome powered flown by his brother René. On 21 November 1913 Pierre Chanteloup in the Gnome powered Type F performed the first commanded loops in a biplane, as well as other aerobatic manoeuvres, at Issy-les-Moulineaux.

Specifications (50 hp Gnome)

References

1910s French aircraft
TF
Twin-boom aircraft
Biplanes
Rotary-engined aircraft
Aircraft first flown in 1913
Single-engined tractor aircraft